Local government elections took place in London, and some other parts of the United Kingdom on Thursday 2 May 1974. Ward changes took place which increased the total number of councillors by 4 from 1,863 to 1,867.

All London borough council seats were up for election.  The previous Borough elections in London were in 1971.

Results summary

Labour won a narrow victory in terms of votes, winning 41.9% to the Conservatives' 40.8%, but won a decisive victory in seats, winning 1,090 to the Conservatives' 713.

Council results

Overall councillor numbers

|}

References

 
London local elections
1974